The 2009–10 Oklahoma Sooners women's basketball team represented the University of Oklahoma in the 2009–10 NCAA Division I basketball season. The Sooners, coached by Sherri Coale and members of the Big 12 Conference, made the Final Four of the NCAA tournament for the second consecutive season, losing in the national semifinals to Stanford. Their Final Four appearance was unexpected entering the season, as they had suffered seemingly devastating graduation losses from last year's team, most notably All-American Courtney Paris and her twin sister Ashley.

Offseason
April 30: Ashley Paris was among the finalists named for the 2009 Arthur Ashe Jr. Sports Scholar Award.
May 4: The Sooners will participate in the 2009 US Virgin Islands Paradise Jam at University of Virgin Islands. The event is celebrating its tenth anniversary. Games will be played at the U.V.I. Sports and Fitness Center, a basketball facility located in Charlotte Amalie, St. Thomas.
May 17: Oklahoma's Whitney Hand and Danielle Robinson were among the 14 finalists announced to compete for a spot on the 12-member USA World University Games team.
July 2:Oklahoma’s Danielle Robinson supplied five points in Team USA’s 93-59 victory of Great Britain in the second round of pool play at the 2009 World University Games.
July 30: The Women's Basketball Coaches Association (WBCA), on behalf of the Wade Coalition, announced the 2009-2010 preseason "Wade Watch" list for The State Farm Wade Trophy Division I Player of the Year. Oklahoma’s Danielle Robinson has been named to the 2009-10 preseason "Wade Watch" list, which is made up of top NCAA Division I student-athletes who best embody the spirit of Lily Margaret Wade. This is based on the following criteria: game and season statistics, leadership, character, effect on their team and overall playing ability.
August 21: The 2009-10 preseason candidates list for the Women’s Wooden Award was released, naming 31 student athletes. Danielle Robinson from Oklahoma was one of the candidates.

Preseason

Regular season

Roster

Schedule

Paradise Jam

Player stats

Postseason

NCAA basketball tournament

Awards and honors

Team players drafted into the WNBA

References

External links
Official Site

Oklahoma Sooners women's basketball seasons
Oklahoma
NCAA Division I women's basketball tournament Final Four seasons
Oklahoma
2009 in sports in Oklahoma
2010 in sports in Oklahoma